1062 Ljuba, provisional designation , is a carbonaceous background asteroid from the outer regions of the asteroid belt, approximately  in diameter. The asteroid was discovered on 11 October 1925, by Soviet–Russian astronomer Sergey Belyavsky at the Simeiz Observatory on the Crimean peninsula. It was named after female paratrooper Ljuba Berlin, who died at an early age. The C-type asteroid has a longer-than average rotation period of 33.8 hours.

Orbit and classification 

Ljuba is a non-family asteroid from the main belt's background population. It orbits the Sun in the outer asteroid belt at a distance of 2.8–3.2 AU once every 5 years and 3 months (1,902 days; semi-major axis of 3 AU). Its orbit has an eccentricity of 0.07 and an inclination of 6° with respect to the ecliptic.

The body's observation arc also begins at Heidelberg in February 1929, or 16 months after its official discovery observation at Simeiz.

Physical characteristics 

In the Tholen classification, Ljuba is a carbonaceous C-type asteroid.

Rotation period 

In October 2003, a rotational lightcurve of Ljuba was obtained from photometric observations by American amateur astronomer Walter Cooney at this Blackberry Observatory  in Port Allen, Louisiana. Lightcurve analysis gave a well-defined rotation period of 33.8 hours with a brightness variation of 0.17 magnitude. Lower-rated lightcurves by Richard Binzel, René Roy and Laurent Bernasconi gave a somewhat longer period of 36, 41.5 and 42 hours, respectively. While not being a slow rotator, Ljuba period is significantly longer than that for most other   asteroids, which rotate every 2–20 hours once around their axis.

Diameter and albedo 

According to the surveys carried out by the Infrared Astronomical Satellite IRAS, the Japanese Akari satellite and the NEOWISE mission of NASA's Wide-field Infrared Survey Explorer, Ljuba measures between 51.017 and 60.80 kilometers in diameter and its surface has an albedo between 0.060 and 0.12.

The Collaborative Asteroid Lightcurve Link adopts the results obtained by IRAS, that is, an albedo of 0.0668 and a diameter of 55.10 kilometers based on an absolute magnitude of 9.85.

Naming 

This minor planet was named after Soviet parachutist Ljuba Berlin (1915–1936).

References

External links 
 Asteroid Lightcurve Database (LCDB), query form (info )
 Dictionary of Minor Planet Names, Google books
 Asteroids and comets rotation curves, CdR – Observatoire de Genève, Raoul Behrend
 Discovery Circumstances: Numbered Minor Planets (1)-(5000) – Minor Planet Center
 
 

001062
Discoveries by Sergei Belyavsky
Named minor planets
19251011